Adele Sigguk (born 1961) is an Inuk artist from Kugaaruk, Nunavut.

Her work is included in the collections of the Musée national des beaux-arts du Québec and the Museum of Anthropology at UBC.

References

Living people
1961 births
20th-century Canadian women artists
21st-century Canadian women artists
Inuit artists
Artists from Nunavut
Canadian Inuit women
Inuit from the Northwest Territories
Inuit from Nunavut
People from Kugaaruk